Shiela is a given name. People with that name include:
Shiela Grant Duff (1913–2004), British author, journalist and foreign correspondent
Shiela Makoto (born 1990), Zimbabwean association football defender
Shiela Marie Pineda (born 1991), Filipino volleyball player
Shiela Mehra, Indian gynaecologist

See also
Sheela
Sheila
Shila (disambiguation)